Amin Babajide "B. J." Bello (born October 31, 1994) is an American football linebacker who is currently a free agent. He played college football at Illinois and Illinois State.

Early years
B. J. Bello was born on October 31, 1994 in New Lenox, Illinois. He played high school football at Lincoln-Way West High School in New Lenox, Illinois. He recorded 81 tackles, 1 forced fumble and 1 interception his senior year in 2011. He also participated in track and field at Lincoln-Way West, earning All-State honors.

College career
Bello played for the Illinois Fighting Illini of the University of Illinois at Urbana–Champaign from 2013 to 2015. He was redshirted in 2012. He played in four games in 2013 and recorded four tackle assists. He played in nine games in 2014 and totaled three tackle assists. Bello played in eight games in 2015, recording one solo tackle, five tackle assists and one pass breakup. He transferred to play for the Illinois State Redbirds of Illinois State University in 2016. He played in 12 games, starting 11, in 2016, totaling 72 total tackles, 6 sacks, 4 pass breakups and 2 forced fumbles. Bello was named to the MVFC All-Newcomer Team in 2016.

Professional career
Bello was rated the 45th best outside linebacker in the 2017 NFL Draft by NFLDraftScout.com. Lance Zierlein of NFL.com predicted that he would go undrafted and be a priority free agent, stating that Bello "needs to be stronger and tougher to hold up as a 4–3 linebacker which is where he'll likely project. Teams could look to bulk him up and see if he could become a situational rusher off the edge, but he'll have to become a quality special teams player to make that a possibility."

Cleveland Browns
Bello signed with the Cleveland Browns as an undrafted free agent on May 4, 2017. He was waived by the Browns on September 1 and signed to the team's practice squad on September 4. He was promoted to the active roster on September 8, 2017.

Bello was waived by the Browns on September 1, 2018.

Arizona Cardinals
On September 3, 2018, Bello was signed to the Arizona Cardinals' practice squad. He was released by the Cardinals on September 18, 2018.

Philadelphia Eagles
On October 16, 2018, Bello was signed to the Philadelphia Eagles practice squad. He was promoted to the active roster on December 14, 2018. On June 5, 2019, the Eagles waived Bello.

Houston Texans
On July 27, 2019, Bello signed with the Houston Texans. He was waived/injured during final roster cuts on August 31, and reverted to the team's injured reserve list the next day. He was waived from injured reserve with an injury settlement on September 4.

Green Bay Packers
On October 1, 2019, Bello was signed to the Green Bay Packers practice squad, but was released three days later.

New York Jets

On October 30, 2019, Bello was signed by the New York Jets, but was released eight days later. He was re-signed on November 12.

Bello re-signed with the Jets on April 23, 2020. He was waived on September 1, 2020.

Los Angeles Chargers
On September 30, 2020, Bello was signed to the Los Angeles Chargers practice squad. He was elevated to the active roster on November 21, November 28, and December 12 for the team's weeks 11, 12, and 14 games against the New York Jets, Buffalo Bills, and Atlanta Falcons, and reverted to the practice squad after each game. He was signed to the active roster on December 17, 2020.

Tennessee Titans
Bello signed with the Tennessee Titans on April 23, 2021. He was placed on injured reserve on August 15, 2021.

Personal life
He is of Nigerian descent.

References

External links
College stats

1994 births
Living people
African-American players of American football
American football linebackers
American sportspeople of Nigerian descent
Arizona Cardinals players
Cleveland Browns players
Green Bay Packers players
Houston Texans players
Illinois Fighting Illini football players
Illinois State Redbirds football players
Los Angeles Chargers players
New York Jets players
Philadelphia Eagles players
People from New Lenox, Illinois
Players of American football from Illinois
Sportspeople from the Chicago metropolitan area
Tennessee Titans players
21st-century African-American sportspeople